Albert Reyes Roig (born 24 March 1996) is an Andorran footballer who plays as a midfielder for UE Santa Coloma and the Andorra national team.

Career
Reyes made his international debut for Andorra on 7 October 2020 in a friendly match against Cape Verde, which finished as a 1–2 home loss.

Career statistics

International

References

External links
 
 
 

1996 births
Living people
People from Escaldes-Engordany
Andorran footballers
Andorra youth international footballers
Andorra under-21 international footballers
Andorra international footballers
Association football midfielders
FC Andorra players
FC Encamp players
UE Sant Julià players
Inter Club d'Escaldes players
Primera Divisió players